Huludao, formerly known as Jinxi until 1994, is a coastal prefecture-level city in southwestern Liaoning province, People's Republic of China. Its name literally means "Gourd Island", referring to the fiddle-shaped contour of the peninsula ("half-island" in Chinese), which resembles a bottle gourd, at the city's Longgang District.

Located on the northwestern shore of the Liaodong Bay, Huludao is one of the three principal cities (along with Jinzhou and Hebei province's Qinhuangdao) in the Liaoxi Corridor, and is Northeast China's gateway through the Shanhai Pass into North China.  It borders Jinzhou to the northeast, Chaoyang to the north, and Qinhuangdao to the southwest, as well as sharing maritime boundaries with Yingkou and Dalian to the east and southeast across the bay.

History
The area occupied by Huludao city has been settled by the Chinese since ancient times. Archeological evidence indicates that during the Shang and Zhou dynasties, the region enjoyed advanced Bronze Age technology, while urban civilization first developed during the Warring States era.

The Ming dynasty saw the construction of the Liaoning section of the Great Wall through Huludao. During this time the town of Xingcheng was fortified with a defensive wall which still stands today.

In 1906, the county of Jinxi was established. It became an important center for resistance during the Japanese invasion. During 1945–1948, it was a battleground between the Kuomintang and Chinese Communist forces, and over one million Japanese prisoners of war were repatriated from its port.

Jinxi county was granted city status in 1982 under the jurisdiction of Jinzhou, before becoming a prefecture-level city in 1989. The city was renamed Huludao, originally the name of the peninsula and port in the city area, in 1994.

Geography
Huludao is a coastal city on the Bohai Sea at 120°38' east longitude and 40°56' north latitude. It lies in the southwest of Liaoning, at the border with Hebei, forming the Bohai Sea economic rim with such cities as Dalian, Yingkou, Qinhuangdao, and Qingdao. As the first city outside the Shanhai Pass, it serves as the gateway into Northeast China.

Climate
Huludao is in the north temperate zone with a continental monsoon climate that brings cold dry winters and hot humid summers.

Administrative divisions
Huludao has six immediate sub-municipal divisions:

Economy
More than 40 mineral resources have been discovered in the Huludao region, including gold, zinc, molybdenum, lime and manganese. As a result, major pollution has been an ongoing issue for Huludao's local residents. West of the city center, the town of Yangjiazhangzi is an important global center for molybdenum mining.

Huludao boasts a long coastline of 237 km, and the surrounding waters are rich in fish, shrimp and shellfish, with plentiful reserves of natural gas and oil. With a climate suitable for the cultivation of fruit trees, Suizhong county is home to the Qiansuo orchard, Asia's largest, which grows a wide variety of fruits including apples, pears, nectarines and jujubes.

Huludao's economy is dominated by some of China's most important industrial enterprises, providing employment for a large proportion of the population. These include Asia's biggest zinc manufacturing operation, the Huludao Zinc Smelter, the Jinxi oil refinery and Jinhua chemical engineering, as well as Huludao's massive shipyard, the building site of China's nuclear submarines. The oilfield off the coast of Suizhong county produces 5 million tons of crude oil annually. Electricity generation is set to increase annual capacity to 3.6 million kilowatts.

In the city itself are special development areas designed to attract foreign investment to the region, including the Huludao Economic Development Zone and the Huludao Hi-tech Development zone, which is the location for a Siemens turbomachinery plant.

Transport

Huludao is an important link in rail and road networks between Beijing and northern cities such as Shenyang and Harbin.

Public transportation in the city is provided by over 25 bus services and innumerable taxis. Traditional cycle rickshaw and auto rickshaws were banned from the city in 2010 but can be seen in smaller cities and towns in the region. Long-distance buses and trains link the centers in the greater Huludao region.

Tourism
Huludao is endowed with scenic areas and sites of historical interest. It attracts many domestic tourists in summer with its picturesque sandy beaches, including Longwan Beach near the city center and Xingcheng Beach, a traditional resort known as the 'second Beidaihe'.

The old town in Xingcheng is a beautifully preserved Ming Dynasty city, with its original walls intact and an interior studded with temples and historical architecture. The hot springs in the Xingcheng region and its uncrowded beaches have contributed to its fame as a health destination for Party cadres across the country, while the stunning Juhua island is a significant tourist attraction.

The Great Wall passes through Huludao in spectacular fashion at Jiumenkou on the Hebei border, where the wall spans the Daqing river in nine gates. It is the only section of the Great Wall to be built over water and was listed as a World Heritage site in 2002.

Other attractions in the area include the remains of Jieshi palace, built by the first emperor of the Qin Dynasty over 2,000 years ago.

Education
Tertiary institutions of importance in Huludao include:

 Liaoning Technical University
 Liaoning Finance and Trade College
 Bohai Shipbuilding Vocational College 
 Huludao No.1 High School

Sister cities
  Las Vegas, United States
  Miyazaki, Japan

References

External links
 Huludao Government (in Simplified Chinese)
 A brief investment-oriented introduction to Huludao by the municipal government (in English)
 A brief introduction to Huludao (in English)
 Satellite map of Huludao on Google Maps

 
Cities in Liaoning
Prefecture-level divisions of Liaoning